This is a list of maritime boundary treaties. Maritime boundary treaties are treaties that establish a specified ocean or sea boundary between two or more countries or territories. These are also called maritime boundary agreements, maritime delimitation treaties, or maritime delimitation agreements.

Africa

Americas

Asia

Europe

Oceania

See also
List of countries and territories by maritime boundaries

Notes

References
 Anderson, Ewan W. (2003). International Boundaries: A Geopolitical Atlas. Routledge: New York. ;  OCLC 54061586
 Charney, Jonathan I., David A. Colson, Robert W. Smith. (2005). International Maritime Boundaries, 5 vols. Hotei Publishing: Leiden. ; ; ; ; ;  OCLC 23254092
 Jagota, S. P. (1985). Maritime Boundary. Martinis Nijhoff: Dordrecht. ; ;  OCLC 	1175640	
 Koo, Min Gyu. (2010). Disputes and Maritime Regime Building in East Asia. Dordrecht: Springer. ;  OCLC 626823444	
 Kratochwil, Friedrich V., Paul Rohrlich, Harpreet Mahajan. (1985). Peace and Disputed Sovereignty. Lanham, Maryland: University Press of America. ; ;  OCLC 12550771

External links

Maritime Space: Maritime Zones and Maritime Delimitation, un.org
VLIZ Maritime Boundaries Geodatabase, vliz.be

Maritime boundary treaties
Maritime
Maritime boundary treaties
Maritime boundary
Treaties